Life After Death is the second and final studio album by American rapper The Notorious B.I.G., released on March 25, 1997, on Bad Boy Records and Arista Records. A double album, it was released sixteen days after his murder. It features collaborations with guest artists such as 112, Jay-Z, Lil' Kim, Mase, Bone Thugs-n-Harmony, Too $hort, Angela Winbush, D.M.C. of Run-D.M.C., R. Kelly, The Lox, and Puff Daddy. Life After Death exhibits The Notorious B.I.G. further delving into the mafioso rap subgenre. The album is a sequel to his first album, Ready to Die, and picks up where the last song, "Suicidal Thoughts", ends.

Life After Death sold 690,000 copies in its first week, soon reaching the No. 1 spot on the Billboard 200. It received widespread critical acclaim upon release and was nominated for Best Rap Album, Best Rap Solo Performance for its first single "Hypnotize", and Best Rap Performance by a Duo or Group for its second single "Mo Money Mo Problems" at the 40th Annual Grammy Awards. The album is widely considered to be one of the greatest hip hop albums of all time. In 2020, it was ranked at No. 179 on Rolling Stone magazine's list of the 500 Greatest Albums of All Time.

Background 
Two and a half years before the album's release, the Notorious B.I.G., who had married Faith Evans, became East Coast's icon in the East CoastWest Coast rivalry and made guest appearances on albums by Michael Jackson and R. Kelly amongst others. The album had numerous planned release dates, one was supposed to be on Halloween in 1996, but Biggie was involved in a car accident in September 1996 which delayed the finalizing of the album. It was pushed back to 1997.

As he explained on BET's Rap City, Biggie aimed to reach a wider audience with Life After Death, collaborating with a wider variety of artists than his debut. In addition to Bad Boy Records labelmates Mase, The LOX, 112, and label owner Puff Daddy, guests include Jay-Z, Angela Winbush, Too Short, Lil Kim, & Bone Thugs N Harmony. A record with Bay Area rapper E-40 was not included on the final track listing. Production for the album was handled by DJ Premier, Easy Mo Bee, Havoc, RZA, Stevie J and other members of Bad Boy's in-house production team, The Hitmen. Q-Tip also submitted a beat for the album; Biggie enjoyed the beat when it was played for him, however, the album had already been completed and turned into Bad Boy. The beat was later used for A Tribe Called Quest's song "The Love", from their 1998 album The Love Movement.

Biggie traveled to the West Coast in February 1997 to promote the album, and shoot the video for the lead single, "Hypnotize." Two weeks before its release, on March 9, the Notorious B.I.G. was shot four times in a drive-by shooting and was later pronounced dead at Cedars-Sinai Medical Center in Los Angeles.

Feud references and subliminal disses 
Conflict with other rappers is a major theme throughout the album. Numerous songs contain references to B.I.G.'s rivals, some subtle and some obvious.

"Kick in the Door" 
The track "Kick in the Door" is directed at Nas, Jeru the Damaja, Raekwon, Ghostface Killah and even the track's producer DJ Premier. The subtle messages have been speculated on by listeners and confirmed by artists on several occasions, including XXL magazine's April 2003 edition, "The Making of: Life After Death".

In "The Making of: Life After Death", Nashiem Myrick reveals that the second verse has lines directed at Jeru the Damaja and DJ Premier: "Nas said that record was for him, but when Big said, 'Son, I'm surprised you run with them/I think they got cum in them, 'cause they nothin' but dicks,' he was talking about Jeru the Damaja to Premo 'cause Jeru was going at Big and Puff and all them [with the Premier-produced 'One Day' in Jeru's album Wrath of the Math]."

The line "Fuck that, why try, throw bleach in your eye" is a reference to Raekwon's jab on the track "Ice Water" from Only Built 4 Cuban Linx... where Raekwon raps.

The lines on the final verse are directed at Nas as a reference to Nas challenging The Notorious B.I.G. for the title of "King of New York" in the song "The Message" from the album It Was Written in which Nas raps:

Biggie struck back with the lines:

In "The Making of: Life After Death" article Lil' Cease explains, "Big talked about Nas a little bit in that shit. It was the King of New York part, the last verse: 'This goes out for those that chose to use disrespectful views on the King of NY.' That's when Nas had that freestyle out, where he was like, 'I'll take the crown off the so-called King and lock it down.' That's when Big had the cover of The Source, and it said, 'The King of New York.

"Long Kiss Goodnight" 
It was speculated by many listeners that the song "Long Kiss Goodnight" contains cryptic insults towards 2Pac and Death Row Records CEO Suge Knight, although at the time it was never confirmed due to the sensitive nature of both rappers' recent deaths.

However, Lil' Cease, Biggie's cousin and a member of Junior M.A.F.I.A. claimed the following in XXL magazine's April 2003 issue about "Long Kiss Goodnight": "That was about 'Pac. He had some shit at the beginning of that though, nobody heard it, on the reel. We had to change it. It was a little too much. I can't remember what Big said about him, but it was terrible. It couldn't make it. He didn't want to do it. He had some fire. But he didn't want to make it too much. He just wanted to address it and to let nigga know, "I know what's going on, and I could get wreck if I want to." Like, "If I really wanted to get on ya niggas, I could.""

Sean Combs, however, denies these claims stating, "Naw, it was just some emcee lyrics. I know people wanna have their imagination, but it was just lyrics. You're hearing it from the horse's mouth. I would tell the truth."

In the first verse, the lyric "Laugh Now, Cry Later" is allegedly a reference to two tattoos on 2Pac's back.
A line in the first verse is supposedly aimed at Shakur:

The last two verses in particular seem to be directed towards Tupac:

The lines seem to be making reference to Tupac frequently mentioning Biggie by name in his raps, and allegations spread by Wendy Williams that he had been raped during his prison term at Rikers Island.
Although some fans have interpreted these lines as references to Shakur's murder, XXL Magazine wrote that the song was most likely recorded before 2Pac's death.

Other references 
In "Going Back to Cali" the second verse opens up with Biggie's thoughts on the inter-coastal war and his relationship with the West Coast:

In the song "Notorious Thugs", B.I.G. clearly refers to longtime nemesis 2Pac in the line "so called beef with you-know-who", calling the feud between him and Shakur 'bullshit', while Bone Thugs-N-Harmony (who featured 2Pac on one of their songs the same year) throw jabs at Three 6 Mafia, Twista, Crucial Conflict and Do or Die.

The tracks "What's Beef" and "My Downfall", both of which deal with the subject of feuding, as well as "Last Day" and "You're Nobody (Till Somebody Kills You)" are also said to contain apparent jabs aimed at his rivals (including Shakur), even though Biggie stated in a Spin magazine interview that the song "You're Nobody (Till Somebody Kills You)" was not directed at Shakur, who at the time had recently been shot.

Critical reception 

Life After Death received widespread acclaim from critics upon release. Jon Pareles of The New York Times described the album as "flaunting affluence with a leisurely swagger, midtempo grooves and calmly arrogant raps". Anthony DeCurtis of Rolling Stone magazine called it a "conscious continuation of Ready to Die", and stated "Life After Death captures crime's undeniable glamour but doesn't stint on the fear, desperation and irretrievable loss that the streets inevitably exact". Cheo Hodari Coker from the Los Angeles Times wrote that "Life After Death reflects both the dark and the heartfelt sides of the rapper's Gemini personality. It's not only a complex testament to who he was in his private life, but also a demonstration of his amazing rhyming ability. In key moments, B.I.G. does a marvelous job of surfing between accessible music fare tailored for the radio, and more challenging material that will be savored by hard-core rap fans who have long admired B.I.G.'s microphone skills. Rarely has a rapper attempted to please so many different audiences and done it so brilliantly". In a five-mic review for The Source, Michael A. Gonzales felt that it would "undoubtedly become a classic to any true hip-hop fan". Although David Browne of Entertainment Weekly was unfavorable of the album's long length, and some of its violent and materialistic content, he commended Notorious B.I.G.'s "bicoastal respect" by working with other hip-hop styles and artists from other regions of the United States.

Retrospect 
Since its release, Life After Death has received retrospective acclaim from critics. Rob Sheffield, writing in The Rolling Stone Album Guide (2004), called it "a filler-free two-disc rush of musical bravado" and commented that the Notorious B.I.G.'s voice and lyrics were "deeper" than before. AllMusic's Jason Birchmeier wrote, "It may have taken the Notorious B.I.G. a few years to follow up his milestone debut, Ready to Die, with another album, but when he did return with Life After Death, he did so in a huge way. The ambitious album, intended as somewhat of a sequel to Ready to Die, picked up where its predecessor left off." Birchmeier further said, "Over the course of only two albums, he achieved every success imaginable, perhaps none greater than this unabashedly over-reaching success." Evan McGarvey of Stylus magazine wrote in his review, "Life After Death is a grand exercise in personal mythology, narrative sweep, and truly diverse, universal pop excellence. As a double album it is the very definition of cinematic; it essentially perfected the concept and standard in hip-hop ... Sequenced as an unpacking of sorts, the album's progression from song to song is an essay itself." In 2013, VIBE named Life After Death the greatest Hip-Hop/R&B album since 1993.

Accolades 
The information regarding accolades is adapted from Acclaimed Music except for lists that are sourced otherwise.
(*) signifies unordered lists

Commercial performance 
Life After Death was released to a significant amount of critical praise and commercial success. The album sold 690,000 copies in its first week. In 2000, the album was certified Diamond by the Recording Industry Association of America (RIAA), denoting shipment of 5 million copies (the threshold for double albums) and it has been credited as one of the best-selling rap albums of all time. It also made the largest jump to number one on the Billboard 200 chart in history, jumping from number 176 to number one in one week. Also, it spent four weeks at number one on the Top R&B/Hip-Hop Albums chart and topped the Billboard Year-End chart as a Billboard 200 for 1997.

Legacy and influence 

Although released in the wake of B.I.G.'s fatal shooting, Life After Death signaled a stylistic change in gangsta rap as it crossed to the commercial mainstream. After Life After Death, Puff Daddy's Bad Boy Records continued to bring pop and gangsta rap closer together: the references to violence and drug dealing remained, as did the "gangsta" rhetoric, but the previously dark production changed to a cleaner, sample-heavy, more upbeat sound that was fashioned for the pop charts, as seen in the single "Mo Money Mo Problems". The Notorious B.I.G. is often credited with initiating this transition, as he was among the first mainstream rappers to produce albums with a calculated attempt to include both gritty and realistic gangsta narratives as well as radio-friendly productions.

The majority of the album was produced by Steven "Stevie J" Jordan, Deric "D-Dot" Angelettie, Carlos "July Six" Broady, Ron Lawrence, and Nashiem Myrick. However, notable hip-hop producers such as Easy Mo Bee, Havoc from Mobb Deep, DJ Premier and RZA from Wu-Tang Clan contributed beats.

Various artists were specifically influenced by songs on Life After Death. Evidence's "Down in New York City" is essentially "Going Back to Cali" from the perspective of a West Coast hip hop artist. Jay-Z borrows four bars from "The World Is Filled..." in his song "I Just Wanna Love U (Give It 2 Me)", as well as the chorus from his song "Squeeze first" from "Hypnotize", a line in "The Ruler's Back" from "Kick in the Door" and "You're Nobody ('Til Somebody Kills You)" on "D.O.A. (Death of Auto-Tune)". Ice Cube borrows the chorus from "Kick in the Door" for his song "Child Support". As with B.I.G.'s "I Love The Dough" Monica's 2010 song "Everything to Me" samples "I Love You More" by René & Angela. The official remix includes a verse from B.I.G. that originally appeared on "I Love The Dough". SWV sampled "Ten Crack Commandments" on the opening track "Someone" featuring B.I.G.'s former protege and friend Puff Daddy. The French rapper Rohff named his album "La Vie Avant La Mort" (Life Before Death) (2001) as a tribute to B.I.G, Joey Badass interpolated the lines 'Kick in the Door' on "Super Predator" from All-Amerikkkan Badass (2017).

Track listing 
Credits adapted from Life After Death liner notes.

Disc two

Disc one notes
 – co-producer
 "Life After Death Intro" contains sample of "Suicidal Thoughts" by The Notorious B.I.G., and "This Masquerade" by George Benson.
 "Somebody's Gotta Die" contains a sample of "In the Rain" by The Dramatics.
 "Hypnotize" contains a sample of "Rise" by Herb Alpert, and an interpolation of "La Di Da Di" by Slick Rick & Doug E. Fresh.
 "Kick in the Door" contains a sample of "I Put a Spell on You" by Screamin' Jay Hawkins, "Unbelievable" The Notorious B.I.G., interpolations of "Get Money" by Junior M.A.F.I.A., "Wash Yo Ass" by Martin Lawrence, and "Robby, the Cook, and 60 Gallons of Booze" by Louis & Bebe Barron.
 "I Love the Dough" contains a sample and an interpolation of "I Love You More" by René & Angela, and "Da Ya Think I'm Sexy?" by Rod Stewart.
 "What's Beef" contains a sample of "I'm Glad You're Mine" by Al Green and "Close to You" by Richard Evans.
 "B.I.G. Interlude" contains a sample of "P.S.K. What Does It Mean?" by Schooly D.
 "Mo Money Mo Problems" contains a sample of "I'm Coming Out" by Diana Ross.
 "Niggas Bleed" contains a sample of "Hey, Who Really Cares" by The Whispers.
 "I Got a Story to Tell" contains a sample of "I'm Glad You're Mine" by Al Green.

Disc two notes
 "Notorious Thugs" contains a sample of "More Than Love" by Ohio Players.
 "Miss U" contains an interpolation of "Missing You" by Diana Ross.
 "Another" contains a sample and interpolation of "Another Man" by Barbara Mason.
 "Going Back to Cali" contains a sample of "More Bounce to the Ounce" by Zapp.
 "Ten Crack Commandments" contains samples of "Vallarta" by Les McCann, and "Shut 'Em Down" by Public Enemy.
 "Playa Hater" contains a sample and interpolation of "Hey Love" by The Delfonics.
 "Nasty Boy" contains a sample of "Cavern" by Liquid Liquid.
 "Sky's the Limit" contains a sample of "My Flame" by Bobby Caldwell.
 "The World Is Filled..." contains a sample of "Space Talk" by Asha Puthli, and "The What" by The Notorious B.I.G.
 "My Downfall" contains a sample of "For the Good Times" by Al Green and an interpolation of "You're All I Need to Get By" by Marvin Gaye and Tammi Terrell.
 "Long Kiss Goodnight" contains a sample of "The Letter" by Al Green.

Personnel

Performers 

 Notorious B.I.G. – writer, rap performer, additional production
 Sean "Puffy" Combs – featured rap performer
 Lil' Kim – featured rap performer
 Jay-Z – featured rap performer
 Too Short – featured rap performer
 Mase – featured rap performer
 Bizzy Bone – featured rap performer
 Krayzie Bone – featured rap performer
 Layzie Bone – featured rap performer
 Jadakiss – featured rap performer
 Styles P – featured rap performer
 Sheek Louch – featured rap performer
 112 – featured vocals
 R. Kelly – featured vocals
 DMC – featured vocals
 Angela Winbush – featured vocals
 Kelly Price – vocals
 Pamela Long – additional vocals
 Carl Thomas – additional vocals
 Faith Evans – background vocals
 Karen Anderson – background vocals
 Keanna Henson – background vocals
 Deborah Neeley Rolle – background vocals
 Ron Grant – background vocals
 Michael Ciro – guitar
 Butch Ingram – writer/publisher

Production 

 Sean "Puffy" Combs – producer, mixing
 Carlos "6 July" Broady – producer, hammond organ
 Deric "D-Dot" Angelettie – producer
 Stevie J – producer
 Nashiem Myrick – producer
 Ron Lawrence – producer
 Easy Mo Bee – producer
 DJ Premier – producer
 Clark Kent – producer
 RZA – producer
 Havoc – producer
 Buckwild – producer
 Kay Gee – editor, producer
 Chucky Thompson – producer
 DJ Enuff – producer
 Daron Jones – producer
 Paragon – producer
 Jiv Pos – producer
 Mike Pitts – assistant producer, editor
 Michael Patterson – engineer, mixing
 Charles "Prince Charles" Alexander – engineer, mixing
 Lane Craven – engineer, mixing
 Manny Marroquin – engineer
 Camilo Argumedes – engineer
 Stephen Dent – engineer
 Ben Garrison – engineer
 Rasheed Goodlowe – engineer
 Steve Jones – engineer
 Rich July – engineer
 John Meredith – engineer
 Lynn Montrose – engineer
 Axel Niehaus – engineer
 Diana Pedraza – engineer
 Doug Wilson – engineer
 Tony Maserati – mixing
 Paul Logus – mixing
 Eddie Sancho – mixing
 Richard Travali – mixing
 Herb Powers – mastering

Charts

Weekly charts

Year-end charts

Decade-end charts

Certifications

See also 
List of best-selling albums in the United States
List of number-one albums of 1997 (U.S.)
List of number-one R&B albums of 1997 (U.S.)
Billboard Year-End

References

External links 
 Life After Death at Discogs
The Making of Life After Death at XXL
 Playing God: Life After Death at Stylus

The Notorious B.I.G. albums
1997 albums
Albums published posthumously
Arista Records albums
Bad Boy Records albums
Albums produced by KayGee
Albums produced by Buckwild
Albums produced by Sean Combs
Albums produced by Stevie J
Albums produced by Clark Kent (producer)
Albums produced by DJ Premier
Albums produced by Easy Mo Bee
Albums produced by Havoc (musician)
Albums produced by RZA
Mafioso rap albums
Concept albums
Sequel albums